Huang Yuanyong  (黃遠庸), (Pen name: Huang Yuansheng 黃遠生, Wade-Giles: "Huang Yüan-yung") (15 January 1885 – 25 December 1915) was a renowned Chinese author and journalist during the late Qing dynasty (清朝) and early Republic of China (民國初年). 
Huang made significant contributions to journalism and literacy in China, particularly as an innovator in both journalistic methodology and writing style. His unsolved assassination while visiting San Francisco, California, United States, was suspected of having been a KMT operation.

Early life 
Huang Yuanyong (Given name: Huang Weiji 黃為基) was born to an educated family in Jiujiang, Jiangxi Province in China. His father was a scholar and an officer in charge of foreign affairs in Ningbo, and a number of his family members were government officials. Influenced by his family, Huang immersed himself in Chinese classics when he grew up. To improve his English, his family hired a foreign tutor to teach him the language.

Huang completed secondary schooling in the Zhejiang province. During his studies at Zhejiang Huxing Nanxun Government School, he was involved in educational reform campaigns and became a member of the Progressive Party. In 1903, Huang came in seventh place in the regional examination in Jiangxi. Nevertheless, the 19-year-old Huang did not follow the custom of becoming a government official, instead continuing his legal study at Chuo University in Tokyo, Japan. Six years later, he returned to China and started working at the Civil Postal Department. Later on, he became a journalist and worked for several different papers and news agencies. Huang was particularly famous for his discussions of politics and social issues.

Life as a journalist

Background 
Following the collapse of the Qing emperor, Huang ceased his work as an officer in the new government of the Republic of China. Li Shengduo, one of the Beiyang five ministers, played an influential role for Huang. He advised Huang to enter journalism, saying that "In western countries, the majority of journalists are familiar with history and international affairs. If you choose to work in this field, there is no doubt you will become a famous reporter." After receiving Li's advice, Huang began his career as a journalist.

Huang soon won recognition for his abilities as a journalist. In 1912, the founding year of the Republic of China, Huang, Lan Gongwu and Zhang Junmai, who were known as "The trio of youth for modern China", first  published Shao Nian Zhong Guo Weekly 《少年中國周刊》 to criticise politics. Later on, Huang and two other young journalists, Liu Shaoshao and Ding Foyan, were entitled '"The outstanding trio of journalism".

Huang was also regarded as "The first genuine reporter in the modern context in China" and his Yuansheng Tongxun, a special column of news dispatch, became the most popular and famous brand in Chinese journalism.

Contribution to newspapers and Magazines 
Huang's first job was to write articles for the Ya Shi Ya' Daily News in Shanghai. The positions at newspapers and magazines that he later served include:

 Shen Bao - newspaper reporter
 Shi Bao - newspaper reporter
Dong Fang Daily News - newspaper reporter
Shao Nian Zhong Guo Weekly - founder and magazine editor
Yong Yan - magazine editor
Dong Fang  Magazine - writer
Lun Heng - writer
Guo Min Gong Bao - writer

With his academic background and working experiences, Huang took up a number of roles in the field. He worked as a chief editor, an appointed regional reporter in Beijing and Shanghai, and a freelance article writer. He was well known for being diversified and productive. In 1915, Huang's clash with Yuan Shikai eventually cost him his job. The news of Huang being shot to death in the United States shortly after his arrival shocked the press and literary circles of China.

Publications 
Among Huang's publications,Yuansheng yi zhu  is a collection which consists of 239 pieces of his posthumous articles. It was published by Huang's friend, Lin Zhijun, after Huang's death in 1919. From 1920 to 1927, four editions of this book were published by the  Commercial Press of Shanghai. It was the first collection of news articles in Chinese publishing history. Huang's articles included news reporting, political analysis, and the like. The majority of Huang's articles were reports of major events and influential people in the turbulent politics of China at the time.

His publications on political issues include:
A Warning to the Trio Superpower 《對於三大勢力之警告》
An Overview of Current Politics 《最近之大勢》
Astray Official 《官迷論》
Conflict between Traditional and Contemporary Thoughts 《新舊思想之衝突》
New Year in Beijing 《北京之新年》
Three Days' Astronomy 《三日觀天記》
The Chef of the Ambassador 《外交部之厨子》

His other publications include:
 My Confession 《懺悔錄》
 Introspection 《反省》
 Passive Optimism 《消極之樂觀》

As a journalist, he interviewed many important figures of the time, including: 
Sun Yat-sen  
Huang Xing  
Song Jiaoren  
Chang Taiyen  
Cai Yuanpei 
Yuan Shikai 
Li Yuanhong 
Tang Shaoyi 
Lu Zhengxiang  
Zhao Bingkwun  
Xiong Xiling  
Duan Qirui  

Huang reported on many important events in China. For example:
The assassination of Song Jiaoren
The resignation of Yuan Shikai
The signing of The Twenty-One Demands
The resignation of Tang Shaoyi

Clash with Yuan Shikai 
Huang initially supported the creation of the Republic of China under Yuan Shikai's leadership. However, the new government became a great disappointment to Huang. He felt that despite the Progressive Party's rhetoric it was still a corrupt organization.

In the articles entitled Big Loan Incident and The Twenty-One Demands, Huang described Yuan's alleged secret deals with foreign powers and betrayal of the nation's interest for his own sake. Huang once described the status of the government as "idealess, dead-ended and hopeless". However, what most upset Huang was the threat to the freedom of the press that he felt Yuan represented. Under Yuan, journalists were prohibited to attend political meetings and the censorship of newspapers also became the custody of the Police Authority.

Between 1912 and 1916 Yuan and his party extended their control over the news media, banning 71 newspapers and arresting more than 60 journalists. These events left Huang with a much more pessimistic view of the importance of journalism.

The incident which triggered the final clash of Huang and Yuan occurred in 1915. At that time, news media sympathetic to Yuan had been promoting his plan to revive the monarchic system in China. At first, he offered Liang Qichao two hundred thousand dollars to write an article in favor of him, but Liang refused. Then he approached Huang due to Huang's reputation. Yuan offered him ten thousand dollars to become a minister and the chief editor of Ya Shi Ya Daily News, which was under his control. Still, Huang was unwilling to violate his principles as a journalist. Huang posted his announcement entitled My declaration of opposing the monarchic system and resignation from all positions of Yuan's group of publishers 《黃遠生反對帝制並辭去袁系報紙聘約啟事》 in most major newspapers in Shanghai, including Shen Bao. Huang published further similar announcements in several papers, including Shen Bao and Shi Shi Xin Bao to clarify his political break from Yuan.

Yuan maintained pressure on Huang by naming him chief editor of Ya Shi Ya Daily News against his will, a position which Huang rejected. Eventually, though, Huang tried to escape this political battle, devoting himself to further academic studies.

Influence on China

Journalism 
Huang's writings were an important element in transforming traditional China into its modern form. Huang and other famous journalists such as Kang Youwei  and Liang Qichao formed the Group of Journalists, which played an important role in late Qing dynasty. As the educated ones, the group's opinions towards the society would be released to the public so that the dark side of the nation could  be disclosed, enhancing the public's awareness of social issues. The group was undeniably a major breakthrough in China's journalistic history.

Huang was most active before and after the Xinhai Revolution. That period was a dark age for cultural development in China, with the interference from the past and the present, China and the West. Huang showed his concern and worries in that period through his writings. Strictly speaking, there was nobody who would write so many articles as Huang did at that time.

Huang emphasized that a journalist should be equipped with four important abilities:

The ability to think critically
The ability to run - to develop and broaden interpersonal network to enrich news sources
The ability to listen - to analyze and co-ordinate trivial pieces into consequence
The ability to write directly, without distortion

Literature 

Many intellectuals such as Chen Duxiu were influenced by Huang's ideas. They organized and published "New Youths" 《新青年》 and "New current of ideas" 《新潮》, which were largely promoted in Shanghai. More than thirty articles of the two publications mentioned Huang's name and his innovative ideas. One famous intellectual, Hu Shih, even considered Huang as the "First Voice" of promoting a new type of literature in his book Wu shi nian lai zhi wen xue (Literature within fifty years) 《五十年來之文學》.

Huang has been regarded as the pioneer of the May Fourth Movement. He termed the movement a "Chinese Renaissance" in 1915, before it had actually started. He advocated the Literary Enlightenment Movement by promoting modern Chinese literature and introducing Western ideas to China. In his article, My Confession 《懺悔錄》, he argued that a prerequisite for the betterment of the society is to improve the personality and quality of citizens. ("今日無論何等方面，自以改革為第一要義", 要改革國家).

Education 

Although Huang achieved a good result in the Imperial Examination himself, he was highly critical of the system. Instead he stated that after the collapse of Qing dynasty, the examination system should also eventually be removed. Although new examination systems and schools were immediately introduced to China following the collapse, there were still a large number of people who gained nothing in the old system and could not fit into the new one. Huang argued that these people would become a threat to the society.

Writing 
Before becoming a journalist Huang immersed himself in writing literature, as classical Chinese literature was still popular in the late Qing dynasty. He was known for writing fluently, with major use of rhetoric and allusion.

However, Huang realized that news articles should be comprehensible enough to be read by many people and that the use of classical Chinese language might obstruct the flow of expression. He therefore decided to change his style of writing. By writing in simple and colloquial language, Huang's articles magnified his critical and satirical attitude.

Mystery of his death 
Huang was assassinated while visiting San Francisco, United States on Christmas Day, 25 December 1915, at the age of 30.

The circumstances of Huang's death remain a mystery, not only because there was political instability in China, but also because he was assassinated in San Francisco, far from his home. As a result, there are several possible explanations for the incident.

There were two versions of the story of the murder of Huang. One possibility is that Huang was shot by a killer sent by Yuan Shikai as payback for Huang's opposition to Yuan's monarchic system. Another version was that he was mistakenly assassinated by Liu Beihai, a member of the Zhonghua Revolutionary Party, which was later known as the Nationalist Party. The Party suspected that Huang was indeed working for Yuan, and his purpose for visiting the U.S. was to promote the monarchic system. However, there is still not enough evidence to prove that Huang's death was related to Yuan, even today.

The date of Huang's assassination has also been called into some doubt. In the introduction of Yuansheng yi zhu 《遠生遺著》, a posthumous collection of Huang's articles,  Lin Zhijun recalled that he had heard the news on the night of 27 December 1915, and gives this date as the day of Huang's death. However, some scholars, including Li Shengduo, believed that Huang was indeed killed on 25 December, as the date the news came did not necessarily have to be the day of the assassination. Therefore, generally, it has been accepted that the date of Huang's death was 25 December 1915.

See also
List of journalists killed in the United States
List of unsolved murders

References

External links
Yang, Zongsheng. Famous Chinese People and the Mass Media. Xianggang : Xianggang Journalistic Publication, 2002.
Li, Longmu. Facts about Journalism in China. Shanghai : Shanghai People Publication, 1985.
Li, Liangrong. The Development of Newspaper in China and the Problems arose. Fuzhou : Fujian Peoples Publication, 2002.
Zhang, Jinglu. Newspapers in China. Shanghai : Guang hua, 1928.
He, Jingzhong. A hundred years of Journalism. Beijing : China Economics Publication, 2001.
Fang Hanqi, Zhang Zhihua. The Illustration of Journalism in China. Beijing : Peoples University Press, 1995.
Tang, Zhenchang. Shi hai xun du. Xianggang: Tian di Publication Company Limited, 2000.
Lin, Zhijun. Yuansheng Yizhu (The last work of Huang Yuansheng). Taipei : Wenhai Publication, 1968.

External links 
The Wuchang Uprising - in 1911
Rise of the Republic China - from 1912
The Period of Beiyang Warlord Rule

1885 births
1915 deaths
Republic of China journalists
Assassinated Chinese journalists
Chinese people murdered abroad
People murdered in California
Qing dynasty writers
People from Jiujiang
Writers from Jiangxi
Deaths by firearm in California
Unsolved murders in the United States